The Schwaben Open is a professional tennis tournament played on clay courts. It is currently part of the ATP Challenger Tour. It is held annually in Augsburg, Germany since 2019, replacing the IsarOpen.

Past finals

Singles

Doubles

References

ATP Challenger Tour
Clay court tennis tournaments
Tennis tournaments in Germany
Sport in Augsburg